"Be Like That" is a song by American post-grunge band 3 Doors Down. It was released on May 29, 2001, as the fourth single from their debut album, The Better Life (2000). The ballad peaked at number 24 on the US Billboard Hot 100 for the week ending November 10, 2001. A version of the song with minor lyrical changes was made for the film American Pie 2 and was featured on the film's soundtrack.

Content
Lead singer Brad Arnold said, "This song was strange, because I wrote the verses and the choruses at two completely different times. And I couldn't think of the verse for the chorus, or the chorus for the verse. I always sing in my vehicle on my way home from band practice, and one night I was sitting there singing, and I put those two together, and I was like, Duh. And like I said, I don't play guitar at all. But I can just like sit down and chicken peck a note out or something. I went home and got a three chord structure going for the melody of it, and took it to practice the next day. I asked Chris [Henderson] to make something out of it, and he came back the next day and he had it, and it just went from there. But that song is just really about following your dreams. And I know everybody has 'em. It's not just about following your dreams, though. It's a little bit about dreams that you've missed, and a little notion of regret, also."

The person in the first verse of the song is fictional, and Arnold left it open to interpretation on whether that person is older or younger. He said: "The difference in a good song and a great song, to me, is the difference in a good book and a good movie: They're both telling you the same story. They both have the same outcome. But whereas the movie is telling you exactly what to see and be heard, the book kind of lets you see whatever your mind comes up with, and it makes it a lot more applicable to your life in a lot of ways."

The songs second verse makes a reference to Northpark Mall in Ridgeland, Mississippi (adjacent to their hometown), a place the band frequented during their youth.

Music video
A music video directed by Liz Friedlander and Nigel Dick and was filmed at Black Park in Wexham, Bucks, England. An alternate version of the video was also made by Friedlander featuring clips from American Pie 2 throughout the video.

Live performances
"Be Like That" was first performed live on April 10, 2000 at WAAF studios in Westborough, Massachusetts. As of April 1, 2019, it has been performed 277 times, making it the tenth most performed song by 3 Doors Down.

Track listings

US promo CD
 "Be Like That" (American Pie edit) – 3:57
 "Be Like That" (acoustic version) – 4:15
 "Be Like That" (album version) – 4:25

UK CD single
 "Be Like That" (radio edit) – 3:57
 "Be Like That" (acoustic version) – 4:26

German maxi-CD single
 "Be Like That" (radio edit) – 3:57
 "Be Like That" (acoustic version) – 4:26
 "Be Like That" (American Pie edit) – 3:57
 "Not Enough" (live) – 3:08

Australian CD1
 "Be Like That" (radio edit of original version) – 3:57
 "Loser" (album version) – 4:22
 "Be Like That" (acoustic version) – 4:25
 "Be Like That" (video)

Australian CD2
 "Be Like That" (radio edit of original version) – 3:57
 "Be Like That" (album version) – 4:25
 "Be Like That" (acoustic version) – 4:26
 "Duck and Run" (video)
 "Be Like That" (video)

Personnel
Credits are adapted from the US promo CD liner notes.
 Brad Arnold – lyrics, music
 Matt Roberts – music
 Chris Henderson – music
 Paul Ebersold – production
 Toby Wright – mixing

Charts

Weekly charts

Year-end charts

Release history

References

2000 songs
2000s ballads
2001 singles
3 Doors Down songs
Music videos directed by Liz Friedlander
Republic Records singles
Rock ballads
Songs written by Brad Arnold
Songs written by Chris Henderson (American musician)
Songs about loneliness
Songs about Mississippi
Songs about heartache